Randers is a city in Randers Municipality, Central Denmark Region on the Jutland peninsula. It is Denmark's sixth-largest city, with a population of 62,802 (as of 1 January 2022). Randers is the municipality's main town and the site of its municipal council.

Randers became a thriving market town in medieval times, and many of its 15th-century half-timbered houses remain today, as does St Martin's Church, also from that period. Trade by sea was facilitated through the Gudenå River, entering Randers Fjord. During industrialization, Randers quickly became one of the most important industrial towns in the country, but it saw itself outpaced by the cities of Aarhus and Aalborg at the beginning of the 20th century. Most of the larger historic industries in Randers are gone today. From 1970, the population saw a decline from a peak of 58,500 citizens, until a stabilization in the 1990s occurred, followed by a modest rise since then.

The main tourist attraction is Randers Tropical Zoo thanks to its artificial rainforest, the largest in Northern Europe, its 350 varieties of plant and over 175 species of animals. The city's football team, Randers FC, play their homes games at the AutoC Park Randers, and are in Denmark's first league, the Superligaen. The town is also home to Randers rugby union club and Jutland RLFC, a rugby league team, as well as Randers Cimbria, a Basketligaen team that took 2nd place in the 2013–2014 season.

History

Etymology
The oldest forms of the town's name appear on coins minted from the times of Canute the Holy (1080–86) until those of Svend Grathe (1146–57). The coins bear the names Ranrosia, Ransias, Radrusia, Rand and Randrusia. Ancient written records include the Latin Randrusium (Saxo Grammaticus, c. 1200), Icelandic Randrosi (Snorri Sturluson's Heimskringla, 1230), and Rondrus, Randrøs (Valdemar's Census Book, 1231). Other early forms provide Randersborg and Randershusen. The name appears to stem from Rand (hillside) and Aros (river mouth) and probably means "town on the hillside by the river mouth". The modern form Randers first came into use at the end of the 17th century.

Early history

Randers was formally established around the 12th century, but traces of activity date back to Viking times. Canute IV of Denmark (ca. 1043–1086), also known as Canute the Saint and Canute the Holy, and as patron saint of Denmark, minted coins in the town. He had plans to attack England and its ruler, William the Conqueror, He assembled people in this town. A chronicle written at Essenbæk Abbey tells of a fire that ravaged the city. The city was destroyed and rebuilt three times in the 13th century. In 1246, it was burned down by Abel of Denmark's troops during the civil uprising against Eric IV of Denmark. On a street in the town center is the house where, according to legend, Danish nobleman and national hero Niels Ebbesen killed Count Richard (Gerhard) III of Holstein on 1 April 1340, during the Kingless Times, when the entire country was pledged to German counts. This action led to further insurrection against the Germans. Ebbesen died in a large battle at Skanderborg Castle in December 1340. A statue to Ebbesen stands in front of Randers' Town Hall today.

When King Valdemar IV of Denmark (Valdemar Atterdag) tried to assemble a government in 1350 after the mortgaging to the Holsteiners, the town was further reinforced with protection, and was often named as Randershus ("Randers Fortress"). This fortification was captured by dissatisfied nobility in 1357. In 1359 Valdemar attacked the captured city with the strength of all of his forces. During medieval times the city prospered as a market town.

Middle Ages

Randers was granted privileges as a market town in 1302, creating a significant amount of trade. It prospered in the 15th and 16th centuries trading both nationally and overseas thanks to its harbour and cargo shipping maintained by competent craftsmen. Salmon fishing also contributed to the local economy.

The town was fortified through much of the Middle Ages. Today, however, the only sign of defensive walls is their existence in street names. These streets follow a circular path, presumably following the location of the historic walls. Street names include Østervold ("Eastern Defense Wall"), Nørreport ("Northern Gate"), Vestervold ("Western Defense Wall"), and Lille Voldgade ("Little Defense Wall Street").

In 1534 a farmers' uprising tried to storm the town unsuccessfully; it was part of wider regional peasant unrest affecting the Jutland region the same year, leading to the death of some 2000 by the sword in Aalborg alone. Massive moats were set up around the town under the rule of King Christian III (1536–1559). The town was already known for its glove-making in the Middle Ages but at the beginning of the 18th century the industry really prospered. During the second half of the 17th century, the town suffered not only from the Swedish wars but experienced the plague and extensive fires. From the mid-17th century, the economy began to thrive once more, the harbour was extended bringing an increase in shipping. By the end of the 18th century, it had become Jutland's largest town with 4,500 inhabitants.

During its peak there were almost 170 merchants' estates in the area, and a sizeable trade fleet that sailed around the world. Some of these old half-timbered estates and manor homes can still be seen in the town. The region around Randers is referred to as Crown Jutland (Kronjylland) and its inhabitants as Crown Jutlanders (Kronjyder), probably due to its large estates owned by the monarchy. It was Denmark's poets who first started to use the term Kronjyde in the mid-18th century. N. F. S. Grundtvig (1783–1872) and Hans Christian Andersen (1805–1875), and especially Nobel Prize laureate Henrik Pontoppidan (1857–1943), used the term. The population in 1880 was 13,457.

Industrialisation and modern times

During the industrialisation, Randers became a centre for the developing agricultural industry and a number of manufacturing businesses and heavy machinery factories also emerged. According to "The Popular Encyclopedia; or, Conversations Lexicon", Blackie & Son (c. 1890), Randers contained at that time an arsenal, a classical school with six professors, and had several industrial establishments, including manufacturers of gloves, for which the town had long been famous. Randers was also known for salmon, rope, and pretty women.

From the later half of the 1800s, Randers grew in several directions, and a large industrial area emerged at the harbour. In particular the crafts and industry sector grew and Randers became one of the most important industrial towns in Denmark. Trade and seafaring continued to be major sectors of the local economy and the harbour was expanded and improved several times during this era. With the opening of the first railway line to Aarhus in 1862, the barge-transports on the Guden River declined dramatically. This however paved the way for a booming railway manufacturing industry. Even though the population of Randers grew in these years, it was also the time, when the town was outpaced by Aarhus and Aalborg.

The glove factory of Randers Handskefabrik was established in 1811, and is considered among the oldest glove factories in the World. The manufacturing of gloves in Randers has been traced back to the 1200s, in the 1600s it was the primary occupation here and from the 1700s the gloves became known abroad, with exports to Sweden, Germany, Russia, France and England. After some decades with declining productions, the factory was built, industrialising and boosting the productions, guided by the knowledge of Parisian glovemaker Charles Mattat. Shops in London and New York were added to the company in 1892. In 1927, Randers Handsker were acquired by the Danish Vejrum family, who still owns and runs the company today.

The larger emerging industries included the Thor breweries, founded in 1856 by the businessman Christian Emil Synnestvedt, but built in 1850 by the Swedish entrepreneur Johan Peter Lindahl. The Thor breweries was an important industry and employer in Randers for many years and the beer brand of Thor is still associated with the city. The breweries closed in 2003, but Thor is still being produced, now by Royal Unibrew in Odense, and there is a sales-office in Randers promoting the brand. The old factory buildings at Thorsgade is considered important for the history of beer brewing in Denmark and some of them are now listed by the Danish Cultural Agency. A 36-metre tall white concrete silo, was for many years a landmark of the town, but it was demolished in 2008 to give way for modern building projects.

In 1861, the train factory of Hvide Mølle was founded in the neighbourhood of Dronningborg by the British consortium Peto, Brassey and Betts. It became a large employer in Randers, at one time the largest, and changed its name to Scandia in 1876, a name and brand that became well known abroad. Scandia produced the IC3 intercity trains for DSB, the Danish State Railway. In 2001 the company was bought by Canadian Bombardier, but the factoris were put up for sale in 2015 due to lack of orders.

In 1894, the machine factory of Dronningborg Maskinfabrik was founded in Dronningborg, also known as Dronningborg Industries abroad. The factory produced agricultural machines and in 1958 combine harvesters became part of the production line. From 1984 they produced for the British Massey Ferguson. The company was bought by American AGCO in 1997 and the production was trimmed.

In 1935 a regional hospital was founded in Randers, located in the neighbourhood of Dronningborg.

Randers became an important military site in modern times. The large barrack of Randers Kaserne was built in 1940 and all in all the town and surrounding countryside could encamp from 10,000 to 15,000 men, in a position which could not easily be overrun.

Geography and climate
Randers, and Randers municipality, lies within the geographical region of Kronjylland (Crown Jutland), a name that possibly refers to the many royal possessions in this area, in particular in former times.

There are several wooded areas in Randers, including Skovbakken, to the northeast of the centre, the smaller Tøjhushaven to the immediate southeast of this, north of the harbour area, and Ladegårdsbækken, a narrow stretch of woodland to the east of the hospital. Dronningborg Skov, in the hamlet of Dronningborg, is located in the northeastern suburbs of the city, and Henriettelund lies in the southwestern suburb of Vorup.

Suburbs of Randers include Dronningborg, Helsted, Kristrup, Neder Hornbæk, Over Hornbæk, Paderup, Romalt, and Vorup. Settlements include Albæk, Asferg, Assentoft, Dalbyover, Fårup, Gassum, Gimming, Gjerlev, Hald, Harridslev, Haslund, Havndal, Helstrup, Hørning, Langå, Lem, Linde, Mejlby, Mellerup, Råsted, Spentrup, Stevnstrup, Sønderbæk, Tvede, Tånum, Udbyhøj Vasehuse, Uggelhuse, Værum, Ålum, Øster Bjerregrav, and Øster Tørslev.

Climate in this area has mild differences between highs and lows, and there is adequate rainfall year-round. The Köppen Climate Classification subtype for this climate is "Cfb" (Marine West Coast Climate/Oceanic climate).

Economy

A vast agricultural countryside, and a central hub for transportation by land, river and sea, helped make Randers a dynamic center for production, trade and commerce. Barges on the Guden River and the Northern River (Nørreå) formerly transported a large number of goods to and from Randers, from the central region of Jutland and in particular the towns of Silkeborg and Viborg. From the harbour in Randers, goods were and are exported and imported.

Most of the former large employers has down-scaled productions, outsourced, moved or closed in recent decades. This includes the military installations and the Thor breweries closed in 2003. The large agricultural co-operative of Dansk Landbrugs Grovvareselskab (DLG) still has facilities and silos in Randers and the regional hospital is also in operation and now employs around 1,800 people. Randers Handsker has a shop and its headquarters in Randers, but the production has been outsourced abroad. In the late stages of the industrialisation, the industry of the city had managed to diversify and a number of high-tech companies are now based in and around Randers, although most are small-scale employers locally.

As jobs in production industries has declined and with the global economic crisis of 2008, the unemployment rate has risen in Randers, especially for young uneducated people. 17.7% of young people under 30, was on public support in 2013, with 8.8% of young people under 30 being uneducated and on the municipal support against poverty (Danish: Kontanthjælp). Many have been unemployed for extensive periods, making it more difficult to regain employment. Occupation in the public sector and the private service sector has compensated a little bit for the job loss, with a slight employment rise in modern times, and the employment rate in Randers is overall regarded as stabilized since 2010. In 2013, 33% of the employed commute every day to other municipalities. Likewise 26% of the jobs in Randers are employed by commuters from other municipalities.

The main economic and employment sectors today in Randers are, administration and service, crafts and industry, trade and transport; in that order. Some of the former industrial areas have been or are being redeveloped into housing, stores, offices and public institutions.

Notable landmarks

Randers Tropical Zoo, Randers's top tourist attraction, is Northern Europe's largest artificial rainforest, featuring about 350 different kinds of plants and more than 175 species of animals, many of which roam free under its three geodesic domes: the South America Dome, the Africa Dome, and the Asia Dome. The zoo is Randers's top tourist attraction. Additionally there are areas called "The Snake Garden" and the Aquarium. The organisation has been involved in the restoration of local wetlands in Vorup Meadow (Vorup Enge), a large nearby area on the southwestern side of the Guden River.

Churches and houses
St Martin's Church dates to the 15th century. Helligåndshuset ("House of the Holy Spirit") once part of a monastery also dates to the 15th century as does Paaskesønnernes, a three-storey red brick house.

Kulturhuset and other buildings
Kulturhuset is a notable landmark building in Randers. It was designed by architect Flemming Lassen in the modernist style and built in 1961. The name translates simply as "The House of Culture" and it holds a number of important public cultural institutions. The most notable are the Randers Art Museum, the Museum of Cultural History and Randers Library. Randers Library consists of a main library in Kulturhuset, two local libraries within the municipality, one mobile library and a local library in Langå. The headquarters of the Museum Østjylland, focussing on various aspects of the regional local history is also situated in the building. The museum administers a few museum buildings in Randers and exhibitions in both Grenå and Ebeltoft.

Randers Storcenter is a landmark shopping mall in the southern parts on Randers next to E45. The mall comprise 58 speciality stores, a Kvickly supermarket, playgrounds, lounges and baby rooms.

Education

Public and private schools – Danish Folkeskole Education 
There are many public and private schools in the city, with Randers Realskole as the biggest private school in Denmark.

Gymnasium and other secondary education in Denmark 
Randers has several different gymnasiums and technical educations. Randers Statsskole is the oldest of the gymnasiums in the city, with many old traditions.

University College anc Business Academy – Post-secondary education 
VIA University College in Randers offers education in fields such as social education, nursing and psychomotor therapy. The campus is located at the city center and was built in 2011.

Dania Academy is a business academy and offers various kinds of educations in the fields of business, technology and IT. The headquarters are located in Randers, with additional satellite campuses in Grenaa, Skive, Viborg, Hobro, Hedensted, Silkeborg and Horsens.

Sport

Football 
The city's major football team, Randers FC ("Randers Football Club (RFC)"), plays in Denmark's top division, Superligaen. Its home ground is the Cepheus Park Randers.

Handball 
Randers has two major handball teams.

Randers HK represents the city in the best handball league for women, Danish Women's Handball League.

Randers HH plays in the second best handball league for men, 1st Division. Both teams play their home matches, at Arena Randers.

Other sports 
The town is also home to Randers rugby union club and Jutland RLFC, a rugby league team.

Other sports are represented in the city, such as tennis, athletics, American football, floorball, badminton, gymnastics, volleyball and many other.

Healthcare

The city is served by Regionshospitalet Randers.

Culture and recreation 
Since 1977, Randers Ugen has been a cultural festival in Randers every year in the middle of August. The festival lasts nine days and presents a number concerts, art exhibitions, theatre and sports events such as the traditional boat regatta of Fjordregatta and the running event of Fjordløbet.

Rander's old former power plant, known as Værket (The Plant), was decommissioned in 1982 and is now a centre for theatre and music since 1990. There is a large concert hall here, several scenes and also an art cinema by the name of KG Bio. Café Sven Dalsgaard is a café and restaurant, named after the Randrusian artist by the same name.
 
GAIA Museum Outsider Art is a small alternative art school and museum since 2002. The museum collects and exhibits art made by outsiders from around the world, defining outsiders as people living outside the social normalcy or are outside the art establishment. The school has around twenty students.

Danish Design Museum is situated close to the rainforest zoo and exhibits Danish design-icons. The exhibits includes both older and modern industrial designs like Bang & Olufsen, Kay Bojesen, Poul Henningsen, various lamp designs, ceramics and other categories.

Memphis Mansion is a museum dedicated to Elvis Presley paraphernalia, inaugurated in 2011. The mansion is a copy of Elvis' Graceland and the project has been initiated and financed by the president of the Elvis Presley fanclub in Denmark. Memphis Mansion is located in southern outskirts of Randers, and had over 130.000 visitors in 2015.

Also of note is the historic craftsmans museum of Kejsergården and the innovative multi-ethnic business and cultural centre of Underværket.

Hotel Randers contains the Cafe Mathiesen, with black and white decor which evokes the art deco era.
 The Niels Ebbesens Spisehus restaurant serves Danish cuisine such as herring or pepper steak (peberbøf) is situated in a red three-storey, half-timbered building dated to 1643. The Tante Olga club on Storegade contains a bar and hosts live music, often jazz.

Transport

Randers is served by Randers railway station. It is located on the Aarhus-Aalborg railway line and offers direct InterCity services to Copenhagen and Aalborg and regional train services to Aarhus and Aalborg.

Notable people

Public service and academics 
 Jens Peter Trap (1810-1885) a Danish royal cabinet secretary and topographic writer
 Otto Jespersen (1860–1943) a Danish linguist, specialized in the English language
 Karin Michaëlis (1872–1950), journalist and writer
 Alma Dahlerup (1874–1969) a Danish-American philanthropist who supported Danish seamen in WWII
 Inger Gautier Schmit (1877–1963) a politician, one of the first five women in the Landsting
 Anker Engelund (1889–1961) a Danish civil engineer and university professor
 Jens Otto Krag (1914–1978), politician, Prime Minister of Denmark, 1962–68 and 1971–72
 Lise Roel and Hugo Höstrup (both born 1928) architects
 Mogens Camre (1936-2016), politician and MEP
 Stefan G. Rasmussen (born 1947) former pilot and politician 
 Tim Sloth Jørgensen (born 1951) a senior officer in the Royal Danish Navy and former Chief of Defence of the Danish Armed Forces
 Henrik Wigh-Poulsen (born 1959) a Danish theologian and Bishop of Aarhus since 2015

Arts 
 Johan Rohde (1856–1935) painter, lithographer, and designer
 Tekla Griebel-Wandall (1866–1940) composer and music educator
Karin Michaëlis (1872–1950) journalist and author
 Stellan Rye (1880–1914), screenwriter and film director 
 Folmer Bonnén (1885–1960) painter and journalist
 Johan Ankerstjerne (1886–1959) cinematographer 
 Ville Jais Nielsen (1886–1949) painter, used strong brushstrokes and sensitive lighting
 La Norma Fox (born 1926), international trapeze artist
 Finn Henriksen (1933–2008) film director and screenwriter 
 Peter Steen (1936–2013) actor 
 Henning Camre (born 1938) cinematographer and film industry administrator 
 Flemming Jørgensen (1947–2011) singer, songwriter, musician, and actor 
 Peder Pedersen (born 1971) film director of humorous music videos and animated shorts 
 Some members of Svartsot, Folk Metal band
 Emmelie de Forest, (born 1993) singer-songwriter, winner of the Eurovision Song Contest 2013

Science and business 
 Niels Brock (1731–1802) merchant, founded Niels Brock Copenhagen Business College
 Bianco Luno (1795-1852) book printer - Bianco Lunos Bogtrykkeri 
 Christian Juel (1855–1935) mathematician, specializing in geometry
 Nikolaj Hartz (1867–1937) geologist and botanist
 Michael Westergård Jensen (1916–1944) merchant and executed resistance fighter 
 Søren Galatius (born 1976) mathematician at Copenhagen University

Sport 

 Leo Nielsen (1909–1968) a Danish track cyclist, team gold medallist at the 1928 Summer Olympics and a team silver medallist at the 1932 Summer Olympics
 Jørgen Rasmussen (born 1945) former footballer, played at the 1972 Summer Olympics 
 Per Bjerregaard (born 1946) a Danish physician, former footballer and Chairman of Brøndby IF
 Jesper Tørring (born 1947), Olympic hurdler and high-jumper
 Anita Christensen (born 1972) a world champion female professional boxer
 Chris Sørensen (born 1977) a retired footballer, with over 430 club caps and 5 for Denmark
 Michael Gravgaard (born 1978), football player with 317 club caps and 18 for Denmark
 Katrine Fruelund (born 1978), handball player, twice team gold medallist at the 2000 and 2004 Summer Olympics
 Jens-Erik Madsen (born 1981), a Danish former professional racing cyclist
 Camilla Dalby (born 1988), handball player
 Niko Hansen, (born 1994), Danish/American Major League Soccer football player

Twin towns
Randers is twinned with:

See also
 Chronicle of the Expulsion of the Grayfriars#Chapter 8 Concerning the Friary at Randers

References
Attribution

Bibliography

Sources 
 Denmark's Market Towns: Randers The Danish Centre For Urban History

External links

 Randers municipality website (Danish only)
 Information on working and living in Randers in English
 Randers tourism bureau
 Randers Rainforest website
 Randers Art Museum
 English Online Information about Randers
 (Sct. Morten's Church website, in Danish only)

 
Municipal seats of Denmark
Cities and towns in the Central Denmark Region
Randers Municipality